William Ralph Myers (June 12, 1836 – April 18, 1907) was an American attorney, educator, and politician who served as the two-time Secretary of State of Indiana and a member of the United States House of Representatives from Indiana.

Early life
Born near Wilmington, Ohio, Myers moved with his parents to Anderson, Indiana in October 1836. He attended public schools and later worked as a teacher. He was surveyor of Madison County from 1858 until 1860.

Career

Military service
During the Civil War, he enlisted as a private in Company G, Forty-seventh Regiment of the Indiana Volunteer Infantry. He was promoted to orderly sergeant, second lieutenant, first lieutenant, and captain, and served four years and three months.

Teaching and legal career
After returning from the Army, Myers returned to teaching. He became Superintendent of the public schools of Anderson, Indiana in 1868 and 1869, and served as member of the school board of Anderson from 1871 to 1879. He studied law and was admitted to the bar in 1871. He established a private legal practice in Anderson.

Politics
Myers was elected as a Democrat to the Forty-sixth Congress (March 4, 1879 – March 3, 1881). He was an unsuccessful candidate for reelection in 1880 to the Forty-seventh Congress.

Myers served as Secretary of State of Indiana from 1882 to 1886. Afterwards, he purchased the newspaper The Anderson Democrat in 1886 and served as its editor. He ran an unsuccessful campaign for the Democratic nomination for Governor of Indiana, but would later become Secretary of State for a second time from 1892 to 1894. He resumed the practice of law thereafter.

Death 
Myers died in Anderson, Indiana on April 18, 1907. He was interred in East Maplewood Cemetery.

References

1836 births
1907 deaths
People of Indiana in the American Civil War
Secretaries of State of Indiana
Politicians from Anderson, Indiana
Union Army officers
Democratic Party members of the United States House of Representatives from Indiana
19th-century American politicians